Archie Kean (30 September 1894 – after 1925) was a Scottish footballer who scored 11 goals from 87 appearances in the English Football League playing for Clapton Orient and Lincoln City. He played as an inside forward. Before leaving Scotland, he played for Parkhead and Croy Celtic, and after leaving Lincoln City he joined Blackburn Rovers, though he never played league football for that club, and then played for Grantham of the Midland League.

References

1894 births
Year of death missing
Footballers from Glasgow
Scottish footballers
Association football forwards
Parkhead F.C. players
Leyton Orient F.C. players
Lincoln City F.C. players
Blackburn Rovers F.C. players
Grantham Town F.C. players
English Football League players
Midland Football League players
Place of death missing
Scottish Junior Football Association players